Port Kennedy was an industrial village located where U.S. Route 422 (Pottstown Expressway) now crosses the Schuylkill River in Upper Merion Township, Montgomery County, Pennsylvania, United States.

Built along the Schuylkill Canal and, after 1838, the Reading Railroad, the village was a center for the lime industry in the 19th century. It was named for Alexander Kennedy, the owner of the quarries and kilns.

Beginning in 1871, a number of important fossils were unearthed at Port Kennedy. The location of the find was forgotten until 2006, when the Port Kennedy Bone Cave was rediscovered.

Planning for U.S. Route 422 between the Schuylkill Expressway (Interstate 76) and Trooper Road began in 1964. Most of the village was demolished for construction of the superhighway and Betzwood Bridge, which opened to traffic in 1967.

In 1978, the National Park Service seized the land west of the superhighway through eminent domain to expand Valley Forge National Historical Park.

Today, U.S. Route 422 separates the First Presbyterian Church of Port Kennedy (1845) from the Kennedy Mansion (1852). They, along with the Reading Railroad station and one house, are the only surviving buildings from the village.

References
Edward Drinker Cope, The Fossil Vertebrata From The Fissure At Port Kennedy, Pennsylvania (1895) from Google Books
Pottstown Expressway Historic Overview

Former populated places in Pennsylvania
Geography of Montgomery County, Pennsylvania
Upper Merion Township, Montgomery County, Pennsylvania